The  Insectothopter was a miniature unmanned aerial vehicle developed by the United States Central Intelligence Agency's research and development office in the 1970s.  The Insectothopter was the size of a dragonfly, and was hand-painted to look like one.  It was powered by a miniature fluidic oscillator to propel the wings up and down at the proper rate to provide both lift and thrust. A small amount of propellant produced gas to drive the oscillator, and extra thrust came from the excess gas vented out the rear. The project was abandoned when the Insectothopter was found to be too difficult to control in crosswinds.

See also
Ornithopter

References

Espionage devices
Unmanned aerial vehicles of the United States
Central Intelligence Agency
Ornithopters
Micro air vehicles